Stasiland by Anna Funder is a book first published in Australia by Text Publishing in 2002 about individuals who resisted the East German regime, and others who worked for its secret police, the Stasi. It tells the story of what it was like to work for the Stasi, and describes how those who did so now come to terms, or do not, with their pasts.

Funder, an Australian, found that Germans often resorted to stereotypes in describing the Ossis, the German nickname for those who lived in East Germany, dismissing questions about civil resistance. She used classified ads to reach former members of the Stasi and anti-Stasi organizations and interviewed them extensively.


Reception 
Chris Mitchell of Spike Magazine called it "an essential insight into the totalitarian regime". Giles MacDonogh wrote in The Guardian that the culture of informants and moral capitulations "comes wonderfully to life in Funder's racy account".

Stasiland has been published in sixty nine countries and translated into a dozen languages. It was shortlisted for many awards in the UK and Australia, among them the Age Book of the Year Awards, the Queensland Premier’s Literary Awards, the Guardian First Book Award 2003, the South Australian Festival Awards for Literature (Innovation in Writing) 2004, the Index Freedom of Expression Awards 2004, and the W.H. Heinemann Award 2004. In June 2004 it was awarded the Samuel Johnson Prize.

Stasiland is being developed for the stage by The National Theatre in London.

References

Further reading and sources

Funder, Anna. Why Germany can’t get over the Wall, November 3, 2009.
Funder, Anna (2019) Interviewed by Jason Steger at the Sydney Writers' Festival.

2001 non-fiction books
Works about the Stasi
History books about Germany